Manhunt is a stealth video game series developed by Rockstar North, as well as several other Rockstar studios, and published by Rockstar Games. The series began in 2003 with the release of Manhunt, and concluded in 2007 with Manhunt 2. The name of the series and its games are derived from the term "manhunt" as used in law enforcement, where it refers to an intensive search for a dangerous fugitive. As of 26 March 2008, the Manhunt franchise has sold 1.7 million copies worldwide.

The gameplay consists of a mixture of stealth and survival horror elements played from a third-person perspective, and has gained controversy for its graphic violence. The games are in a form of an anthology series like many other Rockstar games, and so the plots of the two games are unrelated. Both games focus on protagonists with dark pasts, who must attempt to escape from a particularly dangerous and perverse situation. The antagonist in each game is a character who has betrayed the protagonist, but over whom they exert a great degree of control and trust.

Overview
The individual stages of each Manhunt installment are typically referred to in a way that relates to the game's plot. In the first game, stages are called "scenes," which relates to the snuff film in which the protagonist is forced to participate. In the second game, stages are called "episodes," relating to the mental state and experiences of the protagonist, an escaped mental patient. In this vein, the gameplay itself in Manhunt 2 is referred to as "treatment" (for example, instead of a "Load Game" option from the main menu, the option is "Continue Treatment"). Players survive the stages by dispatching enemies occasionally with firearms, but primarily by stealthily executing them, often in bloody over-the-top ways. In order to carry out executions, the player must approach an enemy from behind, undetected. To facilitate this, each stage in both games is full of "dark spots" (shadows where the player can hide). Enemies cannot see into the shadows (unless they see the player actually entering the area). A standard technique in both games is to hide in the shadows and tap a wall to attract the attention of a nearby enemy. When he has examined the area and is moving away, the player can emerge from the shadows behind him, and execute him.

In the first game, at the end of each scene, the player is graded based on their performance, and awarded one to five stars. Unlockable content becomes available only when the player achieves three or more stars on a certain number of levels. On normal difficulty (called "Fetish"), the player can earn only four stars; one is awarded for completing the scene under a certain amount of time, and one to three stars are awarded based on the brutality of the executions carried out during the scene. On hard difficulty (called "Hardcore"), the player is graded out of five stars; one for speed, one to three for brutality and one for simply completing the scene. To gain the maximum number of stars, a set number of particularly brutal executions must be carried out over the course of each scene; face-to-face fighting does not award stars. The rating system was dropped from the sequel.

Both games feature three 'levels' of execution, with each level progressively more violent and graphic than the last. Level 1 executions are quick and not very bloody, Level 2 are considerably more gory, and Level 3 are over-the-top blood-soaked murders. The player controls which level they use; once the player has locked onto an enemy, the lock-on reticule changes color over time to indicate the level: white (level 1), yellow (level 2), and, finally, red (level 3). As an example, in the first game, if using the plastic bag, a level 1 kill involves the player simply using the bag to suffocate the enemy. A level 2 kill involves placing the bag over the enemy's head and kneeing them repeatedly in the face. A level 3 kill sees the player strangle the enemy and turn them around to punch them in the face, whilst the enemy struggles and gasps for air, until the player snaps the enemy's neck. For the sequel, although the basic gameplay remained the same, numerous changes were made to the mechanics. For example, players were given more choices in terms of executing enemies. As well as the three levels of execution per weapon, players could also use firearms for executions. Two further additions to the execution system were "environmental executions" whereby the player could use elements of the game world (such as manhole covers, telephones, fuse boxes, toilets etc.) to eliminate opponents, and "jump executions" whereby players can attack enemies from above by leaping off a ledge.

The shadow system in the second game was also tweaked. In Manhunt, unless a hunter saw a player enter a shadow area, he would be unable to detect the player within it. In Manhunt 2 however, enemy AI was expanded, with some enemies more vigilant than others. When hiding in the shadows, if an enemy investigates the area, the player may have to mimic a combination of buttons or motions (similar to that of a quick time event), in order to regulate the character's breathing so as to ensure that he remains calm and undetected. In the Wii version, the player must hold the controller completely still. In the PC version, the player must keep the cursor inside an on-screen circle. Climbing and crawling were also added to the game to increase the sense of exploration. Another new feature was the ability to smash lights so as to create extra pockets of shadow.

Over the course of both games, the player can use a wide variety of weapons, including plastic bags, baseball bats, crowbars and a variety of bladed items. Later, firearms become available in each game. If the player is running low on health, painkillers are available throughout each stage. In the first game, the player also has a stamina meter which depletes during sprinting, but automatically replenishes while standing still.

Setting
Manhunt is set in Carcer City, Manhunt 2 in Cottonmouth. Both cities exist within the same fictional universe as Bully and the Grand Theft Auto series. Both games take place in particularly dangerous areas of the city, sometimes to the extent that the area has been wholly abandoned, and subsequently populated by criminals and corruption, whilst cordoned off from the rest of the city. These cities are full of different gangs, distinguishable by their group's trademark outfits, which serve to differentiate them from other gangs. These gangs range from small-time petty criminals to powerful organized syndicates.

History

Manhunt

Manhunt tells the story of James Earl Cash, a supposedly executed death row inmate who is forced to participate in a series of snuff films for a former film producer turned underground snuff director.

Although the game was well-received by critics,
 it was banned in New Zealand, and became embroiled in a media frenzy in the UK when it was linked to a murder, although the police ultimately cleared the game from having any bearing on the crime.

Manhunt 2

Manhunt 2 tells the story of Daniel Lamb and Leo Kasper, two inmates who escape from Dixmor Asylum for the Criminally Insane. The game follows them as they try to put together Daniel's past, all the while being hunted by members of a mysterious group known as "The Project".

Manhunt 2 was originally scheduled for a North American and European release in July 2007, but the game was suspended by Take-Two (Rockstar's parent company) when it was refused classification in the United Kingdom, Italy and Ireland, and given an Adults Only (AO) rating in the United States. As neither Sony nor Nintendo allow AO titles on their systems, this effectively meant the game was banned in the US. In response to this, Rockstar edited the game, blurring the screen during the game's executions and removing the scoring system. This edited version was given an M rating by the ESRB and was released in the US on 29 October 2007. The uncensored version would later be released on PC. However, the BBFC refused to classify the edited version for the UK market. Rockstar appealed their decision, and ultimately, the Video Appeals Committee voted that the game could be released with an 18 cert.

Controversy
The Manhunt series has been a source of considerable controversy since the release of the original game.

The murder of Stefan Pakeerah
On 28 July 2004, Manhunt was linked to the murder of Stefan Pakeerah (14) by his friend Warren Leblanc (17), in Leicestershire, England. Initial media reports claimed that police had found a copy of the game in Leblanc's bedroom, seizing it for evidence, and Giselle Pakeerah, the victim's mother, stated "I think that I heard some of Warren's friends say that he was obsessed by this game [...] If he was obsessed by it, it could well be that the boundaries for him became quite hazy." Stefan's father, Patrick, added "they were playing a game called Manhunt. The way Warren committed the murder this is how the game is set out, killing people using weapons like hammers and knives. There is some connection between the game and what he has done." Patrick continued "The object of Manhunt is not just to go out and kill people. It's a point-scoring game where you increase your score depending on how violent the killing is. That explains why Stefan's murder was as horrific as it was. If these games influence kids to go out and kill, then we do not want them in the shops." During the subsequent media coverage, the game was removed from shelves by some vendors, including both UK and international branches of GAME and Dixons. As the media speculated that the game could be banned completely, there was a "significantly increased" demand for it both from retailers and on Internet auction sites.

Shortly after the murder, US attorney Jack Thompson, who has campaigned against violence in video games, claimed that he had written to Rockstar after the game was released, warning them that the nature of the game could inspire copycat killings, but had been ignored. Soon thereafter, the Pakeerah family hired Thompson with the aim of suing Sony and Rockstar for £50 million in a wrongful death claim. However, on the same day that Thompson was hired, the police officially denied any link between the game and the murder, citing drug-related robbery as the motive, and revealing that the game that had been found in Pakeerah's bedroom was not Leblanc's, as originally reported. The presiding judge during the trial also placed sole responsibility with Leblanc, sentencing him to life. Although the Pakeerahs and Thompson continued to maintain that the game was Leblanc's, their case against Sony and Rockstar was dropped soon thereafter.

Jack Thompson

Following Manhunt 2s announcement on 6 February 2007, Jack Thompson vowed to have the game banned, claiming that the police were incorrect in asserting Manhunt had belonged to Pakeerah, and that Take-Two were lying about the incident;
[I] have been asked by individuals in the United Kingdom to help stop the distribution of Take-Two/Rockstar's hyperviolent video game Manhunt 2 in that country due out this summer. The game will feature stealth murder and torture. The last version allowed suffocation of victims with plastic bags. The original Manhunt was responsible for the bludgeoning death of a British youth by his friend who obsessively played the game. The killer used a hammer just as in the game he played. Take-Two/Rockstar, anticipating the firestorm of criticism with the release of the murder simulator sequel, is lying to the public on both sides of the pond in stating this week that the game had nothing to do with the murder."

On 10 March, he said that he planned to sue Take-Two/Rockstar in an effort to have both Manhunt 2 and Grand Theft Auto IV banned as "public nuisances." However, on 16 March, Take-Two petitioned U.S. District Court, SD FL to block the impending lawsuit, on the grounds that video games purchased for private entertainment could not be considered public nuisances. The following day, Thompson wrote on his website; "I have been praying, literally, that Take-Two and its lawyers would do something so stupid, that such a misstep would enable me to destroy Take-Two. The pit Take-Two has dug for itself will be patently clear next week when I strike back." On 21 March, Thompson filed a counter-suit, accusing Take-Two of multiple violations of the Racketeer Influenced and Corrupt Organizations Act (RICO), as well as a continued effort to violate his constitutional rights, beginning in July 2005. He also accused the Entertainment Software Association, Penny Arcade, IGN, GamePolitics.com, GameSpot, GameSpy, Eurogamer, Kotaku, Blank Rome and the US Justice Department of collaborating and conspiring with Take-Two to commit racketeering activities.

The dispute was ultimately settled before it went to the courts; Thompson agreed not to sue, threaten to sue or attempt to block the sale or distribution of any Take-Two game, and not to communicate to Take-Two or any store selling their games any accusation that they have committed a wrongdoing by doing so. For their part, Take-Two agreed to drop a prior suit accusing Thompson of contempt of court concerning the game Bully, which he attempted to have banned in 2005.

However, in a letter dated 8 May, to Wendy's CEO Kerrii Anderson, Thompson demanded that the restaurant drop an upcoming promotion featuring children's toys designed after the Wii games Excite Truck, Wii Sports and Super Mario Galaxy, because Manhunt 2 was scheduled for release on the console. An excerpt from Thompson's letter states; "[Manhunt 2] will feature, according to video game news sites, beheadings with hatchets, bludgeonings with baseball bats, the jamming of syringes into eyeballs, cutting opponents' testicles off, and 'environtmental  kills' in which common objects in the field of vision, such as electrical cords to strangle victims . One pro-video game industry site is referring to Manhunt 2 as a "true murder simulator" when played on Wii. A dear friend of mine worked for Wendy's and with Dave Thomas closely for years. From that I know that Dave Thomas never would have tolerated the use of Wendy's good name to promote Nintendo's Wii, not with this game available on the Wii platform." Wendy's did not respond to Thompson, and continued with their Wii promotion.

In his final involvement with the game, on 12 May, Thompson sent a letter to Florida Attorney General Bill McCollum and Florida Governor Charlie Crist which read, in part, "Florida retailers are scheduled to sell a very violent video game called Manhunt 2 which will be available, remarkably, for "play" on the kids-friendly Nintendo Wii gaming platform. The Wii device does not utilize traditional push button game controllers but instead utilizes hand-held motion capture devices [...] It is a training device." This prompted McCollum to look into the situation. In a 6 June interview on Fox News, McCollum subsequently expressed concerns regarding how Manhunt 2 utilized the Wii Remote in an interactive manner; for instance, in order to stab someone, the player would have to flick the Remote forward, in much the same fashion one would do when actually stabbing with a knife; when cutting someone's throat, the player would have to move the remote from left to right. The immersive nature of the Wii version would go on to become one of the most controversial aspects of the game.

Legal status

Australia
Manhunt was "refused classification" on 28 September 2004 by the Classification Review Board despite the fact that it had already been on sale for almost a year at the time, having earlier received a classification of 15.

Manhunt 2 was never submitted for classification to the OFLC.

Canada
Following a meeting in Toronto on 22 December 2003 between Bill Hastings, the Chief Censor of New Zealand, and officials from the Ontario Ministry of Consumer and Business Services, Manhunt became the first computer game in Ontario to be classified as a film and was restricted to adults on 3 February 2004. The British Columbia Film Classification Office reviewed the game after the controversy in Ontario and deemed the Mature rating by the ESRB to be appropriate.

Germany
On 19 July 2004, the Amtsgericht in Munich confiscated all versions of Manhunt for violation of § 131 StGB ("representation of violence"). According to the court, the game, portrays the killing of humans as fun, and the more violent, the more fun the killing is. They also said it glorified vigilantism, which they considered harmful per se.

Ireland
Manhunt was released in Ireland with an IFCO rating of 18.

Following the BBFC refusal to rate Manhunt 2, the IFO followed suit, refusing to classify the game, thus making it illegal to sell it. Their statement read, in part; "A prohibition order has been made by IFCO in relation to the video game Manhunt 2. The Order was made on 18 June 2007 under Sec 7 (1) (b) of the Video Recordings Act 1989 which refers to "acts of gross violence or cruelty (including mutilation and torture)." IFCO recognizes that in certain films, DVDs and video games, strong graphic violence may be a justifiable element within the overall context of the work. However, in the case of Manhunt 2, IFCO believes that there is no such context, and the level of gross, unrelenting and gratuitous violence is unacceptable." Manhunt 2 was the first computer game to be banned in Ireland. A poll of 1000 people undertaken by the IFCO showed that 80% of respondents agreed with the ban.

Italy
Manhunt was released in Italy with an 18+ PEGI certificate.

In 2007, Italian Communications Minister Paolo Gentiloni described Manhunt 2 as, "cruel and sadistic, with a squalid environment and a continuous, insistent encouragement to violence and murder." The game was subsequently banned.

Netherlands
Despite a request by parliament for the Ministry of Security and Justice to intervene in the release of the game, Manhunt 2 was sanctioned to be released uncut in the Netherlands, as there was no legal mechanism to block its sale. Rockstar ultimately released the censored version that was released in the US and UK markets, with an 18+ PEGI certificate.

New Zealand
The first game was banned in New Zealand on 11 December 2003, with possession deemed an offence. Bill Hastings, the Chief Censor, stated "it's a game where the only thing you do is kill everybody you see [...] You have to at least acquiesce in these murders and possibly tolerate, or even move towards enjoying them, which is injurious to the public good."

Manhunt 2 was also banned; "The computer game Manhunt 2 was classified [...] as objectionable due to the manner in which it depicts and deals with matters of sex, horror, cruelty and violence. This classification means that it is illegal to import, sell, supply or possess this game in New Zealand."

Norway
Manhunt 2 was cleared to be released uncut in Norway, but Rockstar released the censored 18+ PEGI version.

United Kingdom
Manhunt received a BBFC 18 certificate, legally prohibiting its sale to anyone under that age.

On 19 June 2007, Manhunt 2 was refused classification by the BBFC, meaning it was illegal to sell the game anywhere in the UK. David Cooke, Director of the BBFC, issued a statement, which read, in part;
Rejecting a work is a very serious action and one which we do not take lightly. Where possible we try to consider cuts or, in the case of games, modifications which remove the material which contravenes the Board's published Guidelines. In the case of Manhunt 2 this has not been possible. Manhunt 2 is distinguishable from recent high-end video games by its unremitting bleakness and callousness of tone in an overall game context which constantly encourages visceral killing with exceptionally little alleviation or distancing. There is sustained and cumulative casual sadism in the way in which these killings are committed, and encouraged, in the game. Although the difference should not be exaggerated the fact of the game's unrelenting focus on stalking and brutal slaying and the sheer lack of alternative pleasures on offer to the gamer, together with the different overall narrative context, contribute towards differentiating this submission from the original Manhunt game. That work was classified '18' in 2003, before the BBFC's recent games research had been undertaken, but was already at the very top end of what the Board judged to be acceptable at that category. Against this background, the Board's carefully considered view is that to issue a certificate to Manhunt 2, on either platform, would involve a range of unjustifiable harm risks, to both adults and minors, within the terms of the Video Recordings Act, and accordingly that its availability, even if statutorily confined to adults, would be unacceptable to the public.

In light of the BBFC decision (coupled with the ESRB decision to rate the game AO in the US), Rockstar decided to censor the game. The primary alteration was the addition of a blurring effect over executions; during an execution the screen turns red, and flashes black-and-white, making it difficult to see what is happening. Another alteration was the removal of innocent characters from certain levels. Originally, the game was structured in such a way that the player had the choice as to whether or not to kill these characters. If they didn't, they got the "Good Ending", if they did, they got the "Bad Ending". Rockstar also removed the rating system. Originally, the game had a rating system similar to the first game, where the player was rated based on speed and severity of execution types. To achieve a maximum rating, one had to perform a set number of gruesome executions in each level. This rating system was completely removed from the edited version.

On 8 October, the BBFC once again refused to classify the game. David Cooke stated "We recognize that the distributor has made changes to the game, but we do not consider that these go far enough to address our concerns about the original version. The impact of the revisions on the bleakness and callousness of tone, or the essential nature of the gameplay, is clearly insufficient. There has been a reduction in the visual detail in some of the 'execution kills', but in others they retain their original visceral and casually sadistic nature. We did make suggestions for further changes to the game, but the distributor has chosen not to make them, and as a result we have rejected the game on both platforms."

On 26 November, Rockstar appealed the BBFC's second decision not to rate the game. On 10 December, the Video Appeals Committee overruled the BBFC by four votes to three. However, on 17 December, the BBFC challenged the VAC decision in the Royal Courts of Justice, claiming that the VAC had overruled them based on a "misinterpretation of the law" as laid out in the Video Recordings Act. This challenge superseded the VAC decision that the game could be classified, and halted any possibility of it going on sale. On 24 January 2008, the BBFC won their case in the High Court and the presiding judge ordered that the same seven member VAC panel review their findings, and whatever decision they reach the second time would stand. The VAC did so, but on 14 March, they returned with the exact same result as the first time - four votes to three in favor of classifying the game. The game was ultimately released on PS2, PSP and Wii on 31 October 2008 with an 18 cert, the same day as the rest of Europe.

United States
Manhunt was released with an M rating in the US to relatively little controversy.

On 19 June 2007, the same day the BBFC refused to classify Manhunt 2 in the UK, the ESRB issued the game with an Adults Only (AO) rating. The initial impact of this decision was that major retail chains, such as Walmart and Target would not stock the title. The following day, 20 June, Sony and Nintendo both issued statements saying they do not allow AO titles on their platforms, which effectively meant the game was banned in the US.

In August, Rockstar submitted the re-edited version to the ESRB, who granted it an M rating on 24 August. Later that day, the Campaign For a Commercial-Free Childhood and California State Senator Leland Yee called for a federal investigation into how the game had had its rating downgraded. On 29 August, ESRB President Patricia Vance stated that the ESRB had no intention of revealing how it came to the decision to downgrade the rating.

Manhunt 2 was released for PSP, PS2 and Wii in the US on 31 October, with an M rating. The very next day, 1 November, a method that removed the blurring effect on the PSP and PS2 versions was released by a group of PSP crackers. Leland Yee and the Parents Television Council demanded that Manhunt 2 be re-rated AO, but after examining the situation, the ESRB concluded it was not Rockstar's fault that these hacks could be used and decided to stick with the M rating. Despite the ESRB statement, however, on 6 November, Target removed Manhunt 2 from its shelves. On 22 November, US Senators Joe Lieberman, Sam Brownback, Evan Bayh and Hillary Clinton wrote an open letter to the ESRB asking for the game to be re-rated AO; "we ask your consideration of whether it is time to review the robustness, reliability and repeatability of your ratings process, particularly for this genre of 'ultraviolent' video games and the advances in game controllers. We have consistently urged parents to pay attention to the ESRB rating system. We must ensure that parents can rely on the consistency and accuracy of those ratings." The ESRB again refused to re-rate the game, and stuck with the M rating.

On 31 October 2009, Rockstar started taking pre-orders for a PC port of the original unedited version of the game through Direct2Drive. It was released in the US on 6 November 2009 with an AO rating. However, the game was later removed from the service after Direct2Drive was purchased by GameFly, due to GameFly's policy of not carrying AO-rated games.

Recognition
The Manhunt series has garnered a cult following among video game fans. It has garnered positive reviews for the most part, especially the first game. At the 7th Annual Interactive Achievement Awards, Manhunt was nominated for "Console Action Adventure Game of the Year". In 2010, it was included in 1001 Video Games You Must Play Before You Die, and listed at #85 in IGN's "Top 100 PlayStation 2 Games". The first game was nominated in the 2nd British Academy Video Games Awards in the Audio Category.

Manhunt 2 was listed at #82 in Complex's "The 100 Best Video Games of the Complex Decade". It was nominated for GameSpy's 2007 "Game of the Year" Award for the PS2, and Rockstar London was nominated for the "Best New UK/European Studio" Award. Giant Bomb listed it at #13 in their "Best Storyline in Gaming" list, and at #5 in their "Shocking Moments in Video Games" list. When GameSpot asked Jeronimo Barrera if the trouble that Rockstar had experienced in attempting to bring Manhunt 2 to release in North America had put the publisher off the franchise, Barrera shot down any doubt by confirming that if the fans wanted it, they were willing to continue the brand. Rockstar Games admitted that they were proud of the series and the fact people still want to pick on the games is "a strange and unfortunate reality." Mark Washbrook gave an interview with the Official UK PlayStation Magazine in April 2007, in which he said that much of the reasoning behind the development of Manhunt 2 was its fan base.

Because of its presentation of grim graphical violence and the amount of controversy it has garnered, Manhunt has been noted by many as one of the most violent video games in history. It was listed at #1 in Gameranx' list of the "Top 25 Goriest Games of all Time", at #8 in IGN's "Top 10 Gaming Controversies" and was also listed in UGO's "The Most Controversial Video Games". Machinima ranked it #1 in their "Top 10 Bloodiest Games Ever". The Chicago Tribune called it "The Clockwork Orange of video games," saying that it marked a significant moment in video gaming history by introducing mature content into the medium. Switched.com named it a "modern classic."

During the release of the first game a former Rockstar employee admitted that the game almost caused a mutiny in the company, saying that "It may sound surprising, but there was almost a mutiny at the company over that game. It was Rockstar North's pet project - most of us at Rockstar Games wanted no part of it. We'd already weathered plenty of controversy over GTA III and Vice City - we were no strangers to it - but Manhunt felt different. With GTA, we always had the excuse that the gameplay was untethered - you never had to hurt anybody that wasn't a "bad guy" in one of the missions. You could play completely ethically if you wanted, and the game was parody anyway, so lighten up."

Future
There has been speculation about future titles in the Manhunt series, specifically concerning Manhunt 3, with rumours including the possibility of a PlayStation 3 release utilizing the PlayStation Move. Take-Two, however, have rebuked such rumors.

In October 2007, Stephen Totilo of MTV Games asked Rockstar Games producer Jeronimo Barrera about the possibilities of a multiplayer component being added to future iterations of the Manhunt franchise, such as adding the game to the Rockstar Games Social Club. Barrera seemingly embraced the idea.

References

External links
 Manhunt website
 Manhunt 2 website
 Project Manhunt (now defunct fan website)

Rockstar Games games
Rockstar Games franchises
Take-Two Interactive franchises
Obscenity controversies in video games
Video game controversies
Video game franchises
Video game franchises introduced in 2003
Psychological horror games
Grand Theft Auto
Mass murder in fiction